Sinocyclocheilus tianlinensis is a species of cyprinid fish in the genus Sinocyclocheilus.

References 

tianlinensis
Fish described in 2004